The 1995 Gloucester City Council election took place on 4 May 1995 to elect members of Gloucester City Council in England.

Results 

|}

Ward results

Barnwood

Barton

Eastgate

Hucclecote

Kingsholm

Linden

Longlevens

Matson

Podsmead

Quedgeley

Tuffley

Westgate

References

1995 English local elections
1995
1990s in Gloucestershire